Anoplophora elegans is a species of beetles in the longhorn beetle family (Cerambycidae). It was found by Gahan in the Mine District in Upper Burma (Myanmar). It is distributed in South East Asia (China, Laos, Myanmar, Thailand, Vietnam).

References

External links 
 

 
 Anoplophora elegans at insectoid.info

Lamiini
Beetles described in 1888
Beetles of Asia